Kunku Tikali Ani Tatoo is an Indian Marathi language television series which aired on Colors Marathi. The show starred Adish Vaidya, Shweta Pendse and Sarika Nilatkar in lead roles. The series premiered from 2 April 2018 and ended on 8 October 2019.

Cast 
 Adish Vaidya as Rajwardhan 
 Shubhangi Joshi as Jiji
 Sarika Nilatkar-Nawathe as Vibha Kulkarni
 Gururaj Avadhani as Vishnupant Kulkarni
 Bhagyashree Nhalve as Rama
 Prashant Choudappa
 Rajashri Nikam
 Shweta Pendse
 Rajesh Deshpande
 Amol Bawdekar

References

External links 
 
 Kunku Tikali Ani Tatoo at Voot

2018 Indian television series debuts
Colors Marathi original programming
Marathi-language television shows
2018 Indian television series endings